"That Song" is a song by Canadian-American rock band Big Wreck. It was released in April 1998 as the second single from their debut album, In Loving Memory Of.... While not achieving the same success in the U.S. as the band's debut single, "The Oaf", it charted well in Canada, reaching number 31 on Canada's singles chart. Between 1995 and 2016, "That Song" was the most played song by a Canadian artist on rock radio stations in Canada.

Background

Singer Ian Thornley said:

Reception
Billboard reviewed the song favorably, stating that the song has "spine-crawling beats, jittery guitars...and a boombastic chorus that is so deliciously over the top that you just have to hear it again and again."

Charts

References

1998 singles
Songs written by Ian Thornley
1997 songs